The Mozambican national basketball team is the basketball team that represents Mozambique in international competitions. It is administrated by the Federação Moçambicana de Basquetebol (FMB) (Mozambique Basketball Federation).

Mozambique has qualified for several major international competitions, including the FIBA Africa Championship and the All-Africa Games where they won the Silver Medal at the 2011 event. Altogether it has qualified for the FIBA Africa Championship a total of 14 times, with their best result being the 5th place in 1983.

Competitive record

Summer Olympics
Yet to qualify

World championships
Yet to qualify

AfroBasket

African Games

1991 : ?
2011 : 2nd 
2015 : 5th

Lusofonia Games

2014 :

Current roster
Roster for the AfroBasket 2021 qualification matches played on 27, 28 and 29 November 2020 against Angola, Senegal and Kenya.

Depth chart

Head coach position
  Milagre Macome - 2005-2007
  Carlos Alberto Niquice - 2007-2009
  Luís Magalhães - 2009
  Joseba Martin – 2010–2011
  Milagre Macome – 2013-2017
  Joseba Martin – 2017-2018
  Milagre Macome – 2020–present

Past rosters
Team for the 2013 FIBA Africa Championship.

At the AfroBasket 2017:

|}
| valign="top" |
Head coach
 Joseba Martin
Assistant coaches
 Cesar Mujui

Legend
Club – describes lastclub before the tournament
Age – describes ageon 9 September 2017
|}

Kit

Manufacturer
2020: Lacatoni Sports

Sponsor
2020: Mitra

See also

Mozambique women's national basketball team
Mozambique national under-19 basketball team
Mozambique national under-17 basketball team
Mozambique national 3x3 team

References

External links
Afrobasket – Mozambique Men National Team
FIBA Profile
Federação Moçambicana de Basquetebol - on facebook

Videos
CAF v Mozambique - Highlights - FIBA Basketball World Cup 2019 - African Qualifiers Youtube.com video

1978 establishments in Mozambique
Mozambique national basketball team